Alter Ego is the original Peruvian neo-progressive rock band whose style goes from the ever-changing art rock from the 1990s mixed with new sounds from the 1970s.  Their style crosses between symphonic rock, hard rock to power ballads and R&B.  The band was founded in 1992 by pianist/composer and lead singer Juan Carlos Oganes in Perú (South America), who assembled five other musicians and developed a sound that was rare for the time in that part of the world.  They combined much of the anthem-type compositions of Juan Carlos Oganes with nice and lush vocal harmonies in the style of Queen and Yes.  The album was produced by him and recorded at Emporium Digital Studios. Alter Ego paid much attention to theatrics and used the cinematographic expertise of Oganes -to create a sense of audiovisual entertainment. Oganes also directed their videos.  They recorded much material since their first years and many of those songs ended in their 1997 debut album called Utopia.

By the end of the 1990s, friction within the band led to their momentary split in 2000. Some time after, a new line up was to be formed by Oganes to play new material which was supposed to be released as an album called 'Cinema' back in 1999 before their split. A new album was scheduled.

Juan Carlos Oganes is also known as an actor, audiovisual producer and filmmaker having directed some short and feature films with his company Emporium Digital Studios.

History

1992-2000 

Juan Carlos Oganes, lead singer and pianist, and Antonio Valero, guitarist, were playing in a folk band called Yawar Macta playing mainly cover songs of popular folk groups of South America. Oganes and Valero were classmates and also long-time friends who shared similar musical tastes; Oganes was also a keyboard player in another band during school years which had quite a following but wasn't serious in its intent. Still, he was very eager to share and do his own musical ideas so he quit the band in 1992 to form Alter Ego. At early years many members were tested for musicianship but many weren't up for it. The band had a number of bass players during this period, but it was not until 1994 that the original line-up was set and playing steady.

the Album 

By January 1997, the band got into the studio to record its debut album called Utopia, produced and engineered by Juan Carlos Oganes and was released in late August of the same year. It contained many songs recorded in early years together with some recent ones. As they explained, it was to be taken as a "history album" as it showed the progress of the band from its dawn up to that point in their career. The album took some time to start gaining momentum. The band played pubs and concerts and toured frequently to support the album with many appearances on TV and guest interviews. They also released some music videoclips in 1999 which from the start began to call attention as it happened with their first single "What's The Fire" that reached No. 2 on TV music charts competing with other known bands of those years. In May of that year they released their second single called "Sirenia" which reached No. 1 and stayed on that position for two weeks on TV Music charts. Concerts came plenty together with more TV appearances. Later that year they released their third single called "Escúchame" which reached No. 3 on TV charts.

Despite their many TV appearances and concerts they never had radio support as the music was considered non-commercial (although some critics recognized the catchy single Sirenia as radio-friendly). Only one radio station aired a song which was never released as a single called "Cazador Furtivo" in February 1998, but it wasn't enough for support.

By the end of 1999 they went back to Emporium Digital Studios to begin recording what was to be their second album called Cinema.

In early 2000, Oganes made contact with a Chilean entrepreneur to take the band to Chile to support the album. They also played one of the biggest festivals in Ica to thousands of attendees and fans.

Disagreements in band members together with personal problems forced Oganes to split the band and put it on stand-by. Regardless of member intents to get together, Oganes kept out of the picture and the band never really reunited again as he holds the copyrights for the name and songs. He never declared the band officially terminated and the question of a new comeback was held in suspense for some time until recently when he declared the intention to form a new line-up for Alter Ego.

The new Alter Ego

2000-? 

The side-projects of Juan Carlos Oganes kept him busy over the years but he remained close to the music and film industry producing albums for other bands and solo artists and making movies. Planning for a new come-back were said to happen in 2003 and 2004 and there is proof that some songs were already recorded in 1999 for their second album which is bound to be released by the middle of the decade with a new Alter Ego line-up. Now it is confirmed that they are releasing an album on 2006 with new and unreleased songs of the primer era of the band with Oganes producing again and recording on Emporium Digital Studios. Recent news on Peruvian newspapers stated the new way of recording they'll use taking advantage of today's technology and preparing private FTP servers to upload and download their music parts and send them to band members overseas. During the mixdown, the studio downloads the audio parts at full resolution to blend them together properly. Band members are also discussing the possibility of filming a new music videoclip of the former album which became a reality in September 2008 with the song Utopia shot in High Definition and directed by Oganes.

External links 
ALTER EGO fansite
EMPORIUM DIGITAL STUDIOS -Audio, Video & Cine Digital
ALTER EGO -Página Oficial de la banda peruana de rock neo-progresivo
ALTER EGO -MySpace Oficial de la banda peruana de rock neo-progresivo

Peruvian rock music groups
Peruvian progressive rock groups